Anton Haselmayer (12 April 1895 – 22 January 1962) was a Nazi Party official who served as Gauleiter of Gau Hesse-Nassau South, but was later dismissed and expelled from the Party.

Life
Haselmayer was born in Frankfurt am Main. After graduating from gymnasium in 1914, he began studying law and then became a journalist. Haselmayer was an early adherent of the Nazi Party, joining it on 1 April 1925 (membership number 36) shortly after the lifting of the national ban that had been imposed on it in the wake of the failed Beer Hall Putsch.

At the end of 1925, when the large Gau of Hesse-Nassau was divided in two, he was named the first Gauleiter for Gau Hesse-Nassau South, which comprised the People's State of Hesse and the southern section of the Prussian Province of Hesse-Nassau, with its capital at Frankfurt am Main. 
 
In these early years of the Party's development when the ban on Adolf Hitler’s public speaking was still in effect, the Gauleiter served as the public face of the Party. Like all Gauleiters, Haselmayer was directly responsible to Hitler and was his personal representative to the Gau. As such, he wielded considerable power over all Party matters within his jurisdiction.

Haselmayer also was part of the Party’s Reichsleitung (National Leadership) serving in the leadership of the NSDAP Office of Military Policy under Franz Ritter von Epp. This was a precursor organization to the NSDAP Office of Colonial Policy.

On 23 July 1926, Haselmayer was injured in an attempted assassination attempt in Frankfurt. On 28 July, Hitler wrote a letter to Haselmayer wishing him a speedy recovery and hoping that he would soon be well enough to extract revenge on the perpetrators. However on 22 September 1926, Haselmayer resigned as Gauleiter, ostensibly “for health reasons,” though the real reasons for his resignation were never entirely made clear. Furthermore, on 1 October 1928 he was expelled from the Nazi Party. 

In 1930 his petition for reinstatement was denied. In March 1936 he obtained a law license and began working as an attorney in Munich. On 5 February 1937, his final petition for clemency and for readmission to the Party was denied. He was even accused of having staged the 1926 attack on himself as a way of improving his standing in the Party. The truth has never been definitively established. No additional details are known of Haselmayer's fate.

References

Sources

1895 births
1962 deaths
Gauleiters
Lawyers in the Nazi Party
Nazi Party officials
People from Frankfurt